1976 London bombing may refer to:

January 1976 West End bombs
Cannon Street train bombing
West Ham station attack
1976 Olympia bombing